President Mir Qanbar is a 2005 Iranian documentary film directed by Mohammad Shirvani. The film follows Mir Qanbar, an elderly Iranian man, as he campaigns in the country's presidential election.

The film won the Award of Excellence at the Yamagata International Documentary Film Festival in 2005 and in 2007 won the Audience Favorite award at the Noor Iranian Film Festival in Los Angeles.

See also
 Fat Shaker

External links
 

2005 films
2000s Persian-language films
Iranian documentary films
Documentary films about politicians
Documentary films about elections
2005 documentary films